Agha Faisal was born in Karachi on 8th November 1972. He has a B.Sc. Finance from Miami University, LL.B.Hons from University of Buckingham and was called to the Bar of England and Wales by Lincoln’s Inn. He was enrolled to practice in 1998;  certified to appear before the High Courts in 2000; and signed the roll at the Supreme Court in 2012. Whilst in practice, he remained an honorary lecturer at S. M. Law College Karachi and occasionally penned articles for national newspapers. He was elevated to the bench at the High Court of Sindh on 6th February 2018. In addition to his duties on the bench, he serves on the Judicial Service Tribunal for the subordinate judiciary in Sindh and served as the Senate Tribunal Sindh, for the 2021 Senate Elections. Administratively, he is a member of the High Court’s Selection Committee for Promotion - Grade 16 and above; and the committees for Development, Building Maintenance and Horticulture. Additionally, he is the monitoring and inspecting Judge for the District of Naushahro Feroze. He has lectured at the Sindh Judicial Academy; serves on the syndicates of the University of Karachi, SZAB University of Law Karachi, Dow University of Health Sciences Karachi and BBS University Khairpur; and is a member of the board of governors of the law colleges of Karachi. He was the Sindh High Court’s delegate to the US Pakistan consultations on digital economy issues held in autumn 2021 at Washington DC.

https://www.sindhhighcourt.gov.pk/Justice_Mr_Agha_Faisal.php

References

1972 births
Living people
Judges of the Sindh High Court
Pakistani judges